Nitella is a genus of charophyte green algae in the family Characeae.

Species 
The species in the genus include:

Nitella abyssinica A. Braun
 Nitella acuminata A. Braun ex Wallman
Nitella aemula A. Braun
 Nitella annandalei B.P. Pal
 Nitella australiensis (F.M. Bailey) J.C. van Raam
 Nitella axillaris A. Braun
 Nitella axilliformis Imahori
 Nitella capillaris (A.J.Krocker) J.Groves & G.R.Bullock-Webster
 Nitella comptonii J. Groves
 Nitella cristata A. Braun
 Nitella diffusa A. Braun
 Nitella flexilis (Linnaeus) C. Agardh
 Nitella furcata (Roxburgh ex Bruzelius) C. Agardh
 Nitella gelatinifera R.D. Wood
 Nitella gelatinosa A. Braun
 Nitella gloeostachys A. Braun
 Nitella gracilens Morioka
 Nitella gracilis (J.E.Smith) C.Agardh
 Nitella gracillima T.F. Allen
 Nitella haagenii J.C. van Raam
 Nitella heterophylla A. Braun
 Nitella hookeri A. Braun
 Nitella horikawae Imahori
 Nitella hyalina (De Candolle) C. Agardh
 Nitella ignescens García
 Nitella imahorii R.D. Wood
 Nitella imperialis (Allen) Sakayama
 Nitella inversa Imahori
 Nitella leonhardii R.D. Wood
 Nitella leptoclada A. Braun
 Nitella leptostachys A. Braun
 Nitella megaspora (J. Groves) H. Sakayama
 Nitella mirabilis Nordstedt ex J. Groves
 Nitella moniliformis Zaneveld
 Nitella monopodiata J.C. van Raam
 Nitella moriokae R.D. Wood
 Nitella morongii T.F. Allen
 Nitella mucronata (A.Braun) F.Miquel
 Nitella myriotricha A. Braun ex Kützing
 Nitella obtusa T.F.Allen
 Nitella oligospira A. Braun
 Nitella opaca C. Agardh ex Bruzelius
 Nitella ornithopoda A. Braun
 Nitella penicillata A. Braun
 Nitella polycephala Kützing
 Nitella praelonga A. Braun
 Nitella pseudoflabellata A. Braun
 Nitella pulchella Allen
 Nitella sonderi A. Braun
 Nitella spanioclema J. Groves & Bullock-Webster ex Bullock-Webster
 Nitella spiciformis Morioka
 Nitella stuartii A. Braun
 Nitella subtilissima A. Braun
 Nitella syncarpa (J.L.Thuillier) Kützing
 Nitella tasmanica Müller ex A.Braun
 Nitella tenuissima (Desvaux) Kützing
 Nitella terrestris M.Iyengar
 Nitella translucens (Persoon) C. Agardh
 Nitella tricellularis (Nordst.) Nordst. in T.F.Allen, em. R.D. Wood
 Nitella tumida Nordstedt
 Nitella tumulosa Zaneveld
 Nitella ungula García
 Nitella verticillata (N.Filarszky & G.O.Allen ex Filarszky) R.D.Wood
 Nitella vieillardii (A.Braun) Sakayama
 Nitella virgata Wallman
 Nitella wahlbergiana Wallman
 Nitella woodii Hotchkiss & Imahori
 Nitella zamanii Naz, Diba & Schubert  
 Nitella zeyheri A.Braun ex Kützing
 Nitella zollingeri (A.Braun) R.D.Wood

References 

Charophyta
Charophyta genera
Taxa named by Carl Adolph Agardh